Poovellam Kettuppar is a 1999 Indian Tamil-language romantic comedy musical film written and directed by Vasanth. It stars Suriya and Jyothika. Vijayakumar, Nassar, Vadivelu and Ambika appear in supporting roles. This movie was named after some lyrics from a song called "En Veetu Thottathil" from the movie Gentleman (1993). The film was released on 6 August 1999.

Plot 

Two music directors, Bharathi and Kannan, used to be friends and composed music together. After Kannan has a fight with the director on a project, Bharathi decides to split from Kannan and compose the music by himself. He offers Kannan the chance to reconcile after the movie, but Kannan rejects the offer and gives details about the fallout to newspapers, causing Bharathi to lose the movie deal.

Kannan's daughter Janaki lives with her grandparents and mother in Bangalore while her father, struggles with his friend Ramanathan in Chennai. Janaki goes on a college tour and stays at a hotel, where Krishna, Bharathi's son, is staying. He falls in love with her and tries to woo her, but she rejects his advances. Four days later, Janaki misses her bus to college and she takes a public bus home. Krishna gets on the bus to impress her. After taking a ride from a drunk driver, Janaki lets Krishna drive.

On the way, the drunk driver becomes sober and leaves them stranded until Janaki stops another bus. On their journey, they learn their fathers' identities. Krishna takes Janaki back to her college and leaves, but they admit their feelings for one another. Krishna has to return to Chennai because his mother is in the hospital. He promises Janaki that he will speak to his father about their marriage, and Janaki has one condition: if they disapprove, she will not elope with Krishna without her parents' consent. Krishna agrees and goes to see his mother.

The doctor tells Krishna's mother that she will send a nurse to their home to help her. At the same time, Bharathi has a fallout with a prominent music director and Kannan is recruited to anger Bharathi. Kannan's music in the movie becomes successful and he becomes an overnight sensation — gaining fame and being flooded with offers. Bharathi is severely affected by the fallout and loses his status and offers, further angering him. In response, Krishna goes to Kannan's house as a driver while telling his parents that he went to Bombay to pursue further studies, and Janaki pretends to be the nurse that the family doctor sent and tells her parents that she has an extra class at college.

Krishna assumes the name of Driver Pandi while Janaki becomes Nurse Kalyani. Janaki impresses Krishna's parents while Krishna does the same with Janaki's. Problems arise when Krishna is kicked out of Kannan's house when he takes the blame for Kannan's father-in-law accidentally telling the media about Kannan's drinking. Janaki is kicked out as she stands up to Bharathi and tells him it is ironic that he is named after Bharathiyaar, who fought for women's rights, when he does not allow his wife to sing in public after their marriage.

Bharathi realises his mistake and invites Janaki back. Krishna, however, has to struggle much more to gain back Kannan's trust. Kannan has a fight with a director, which gives Kannan a bad image in the media. When Kannan realises that Krishna helped him out despite his anger, he invites him back to his house. Krishna and Janaki tell Kannan and Bharathi that they are in love and that their parents and their lover's parents are against it. They convince them to speak to the lovers' parents. The families arrive at a beach house. Krishna's parents accept the union, but Kannan storms off. Kannan's wife convinces the couple that Kannan will not miss his only daughter's wedding.

Kannan does not turn up for the wedding. Janaki and Krishna turn up at his house; Krishna tells him that they are not married and that they won't until he approves. Krishna claims that they will wait and remain lovers until Kannan gives his consent. As Krishna drives away, he comes to a sudden halt as Kannan and his family block his path. Kannan tells him that he better marry Janaki or else. Janaki then brings Bharathi while Krishna brings Kannan to him, and they reconcile.

Cast 

 Surya as Krishna/Palpandi
 Jyothika as Janaki Kannan/Kalyani 
 Vijayakumar as K. R. Bharathi
 Nassar as C.R. Kannan
 Ambika as Nirmala Bharathi
 Karan as Venu Mahadevan
 Delhi Ganesh as Ramanathan
 Vadivelu as Shanmugam
 Vadivukkarasi as Kasthuri
 Kovai Sarala as Dr. Bala Thirupurasundari
 Maadhu Balaji as Balaji
 Dhamu as Dhamu
 Madhan Bob as Rathavelu
 Kaka Radhakrishnan as Rangasamy
 Kavitha as Lakshmi
 Pasi Sathya as Nurse Kalyani
 Thadi Balaji as Reporter
 Raju Sundaram (special appearance in the songs "CBI Enge" and "Oh Senyoreeta")
 Bhavatharini as herself (special appearance)
 Agathian as himself (special appearance)
 Ramki as himself (special appearance)
 Parthiban as himself (special appearance)
 Manorama as herself (special appearance)
 Shankar–Ganesh (Ganesh) as himself (special appearance)
 Pyramid Natarajan as himself (special appearance)
Kushboo as herself (special appearance)

Production 
The film was initially titled Romance, but was later retitled Poovellam Kettuppar during production. Poovellam Kettupar was one of the working titles for director's previous film Aasai (1995). Vasanth considered changing the title again briefly to Thathi Thaavathu Manasu, but eventually decided not to do so. During production, media speculation arose that the lead pair, Suriya and Jyothika, were dating. The film was the first of seven films in which Suriya appeared alongside Jyothika, whom he married in 2006.

The film shared a similar storyline to several other Tamil films released during the same period. The Prashanth and Simran starred in Jodi, which incidentally had Vijayakumar and Nassar playing similar roles as leaders of feuding families. Likewise the films Minsara Kanna (1999) and Anbulla Kadhalukku (1999) also had similar plots.

Soundtrack 

The soundtrack features eight songs composed by Yuvan Shankar Raja.

Reception 
A critic from The New Indian Express wrote that the "absolutely enchanting musical score [...] bears testimony to his ‘Raja’ surname." The album became very popular, particularly songs like "Irava Pagala", "Oh Senyoreeta" and "Chudithar Aninthu", gaining him first time notice, especially among young people and children. The album opened the opportunity for his first breakthrough in the industry and proved to be a major turning point in his career.

Critical reception 
A critic from Indolink wrote that the film "provides clean entertainment all the way", while mentioning that "Suriya and Jyothika provide adequate fun and romance with their more than average acting". Rediff.com described the film as "a winner" and praised Vasanth's direction. The Hindu praised that director "maintains a light vein right through, the humour escalating as the drama thickens". Kalki praised the film's cast, humour and music.

Box office 
Although the film performed well outside of India, it was received poorly domestically, which Vasanth attributes to when the film was released and the lack of publicity.

Award 
Renuga Vasanth, Vasanth's wife, won the Tamil Nadu State Film Award for Best Costume Designer in 1999 for her work in the film.

References

External links 
 

1999 romantic comedy films
1990s romantic musical films
1990s Tamil-language films
1999 films
Films about film directors and producers
Films about filmmaking
Films about music and musicians
Films directed by Vasanth
Films scored by Yuvan Shankar Raja
Films shot in Ooty
Films with screenplays by Crazy Mohan
Indian romantic comedy films
Indian romantic musical films